Grünhainichen is a municipality in the district Erzgebirgskreis, in Saxony, Germany. On 1 March 2009, Grünhainichen and the neighboring municipality Waldkirchen were merged. On 1 January 2015, the former municipality Borstendorf became part of Grünhainichen.

Economy and infrastructure

Companies 

 Wendt & Kühn KG
 Druckerei Emil Gutermuth
 Zabag Anlagentechnik GmbH
 Grünperga Papier GmbH
 Kartonagenfabrik K. Emil Nebel
 Kunsthandwerk Christine Blank
 Erzi Qualitätsprodukte aus Holz GmbH

Transport 
 Flöha Valley Railway
 Bus connexions to Eppendorf, Zschopau, Flöha, Augustusburg

References 

Erzgebirgskreis